Outer coat can refer to:

 Overcoat, an outerwear coat
 Guard hair, the longest, most coarse hairs in a mammal's coat
 Tunica adventitia (vessels), the outermost layer of a blood vessel